R. darwinii may refer to:
 Rhea darwinii, a synonym for Rhea pennata, Darwin's rhea, a flightless bird species
 Rhinoderma darwinii, the Darwin's frog, a frog species native to the forest streams of Argentina and Chile

See also
 Darwinii (disambiguation)
 R. darwinii (disambiguation)